An emirp (prime spelled backwards) is a prime number that results in a different prime when its decimal digits are reversed.  This definition excludes the related palindromic primes. The term reversible prime is  used to mean the same as emirp, but may also, ambiguously, include the palindromic primes.  

The sequence of emirps begins 13, 17, 31, 37, 71, 73, 79, 97, 107, 113, 149, 157, 167, 179, 199, 311, 337, 347, 359, 389, 701, 709, 733, 739, 743, 751, 761, 769, 907, 937, 941, 953, 967, 971, 983, 991, ... .

All non-palindromic permutable primes are emirps.

, the largest known emirp is 1010006+941992101×104999+1, found by  Jens Kruse Andersen in October 2007.

The term 'emirpimes' (singular) is used also in places to treat semiprimes in a similar way.  That is, an emirpimes is a semiprime that is also a (distinct) semiprime upon reversing its digits.

It is an open problem whether there are infinitely many emirps.

Other bases

The emirps in base 12 are (using rotated two and three for ten and eleven, respectively):
15, 51, 57, 5Ɛ, 75, Ɛ5, 107, 117, 11Ɛ, 12Ɛ, 13Ɛ, 145, 157, 16Ɛ, 17Ɛ, 195, 19Ɛ, 1ᘔ7, 1Ɛ5, 507, 51Ɛ, 541, 577, 587, 591, 59Ɛ, 5Ɛ1, 5ƐƐ, 701, 705, 711, 751, 76Ɛ, 775, 785, 7ᘔ1, 7ƐƐ, Ɛ11, Ɛ15, Ɛ21, Ɛ31, Ɛ61, Ɛ67, Ɛ71, Ɛ91, Ɛ95, ƐƐ5, ƐƐ7, ...

Emirps with added mirror properties
There is a subset of emirps x, with mirror xm, such that x is the yth prime, and xm is the ymth prime. (E.g. 73 is the 21st prime number; its mirror, 37, is the 12th prime number; 12 is the mirror of 21.)

Twin emirp
A twin emirp (or emirp twin) is a pair of emirp such that the smaller one and its reversal is a twin prime. For example 71 is the smallest twin emirp. 71, 73, 17 and 19 are all different primes, so 71 is a twin emirp.

The sequence of twin emirps is  71, 1031, 1151, 1229, 3299, 3371, 3389, 3467, 3851, 7457, 7949, 9011, 9437, 10007, ... (the sequence A175215 in the OEIS).

The largest found Twin emirp is 10499 + 174295123052 +/-1. 

The smallest twin emirp that is sum of first twin emirps is 71 + 1031 + 1151 + ... + 901814489 = 18036881674937

References 

Classes of prime numbers
Base-dependent integer sequences